Cornelscourt is a small suburban area within the traditional County Dublin, now in the jurisdiction of Dún Laoghaire–Rathdown. Situated between Cabinteely and Foxrock, it is a primarily residential area, but is perhaps best known for being the site of Ireland's first big-box store, a branch of Dunnes Stores, and the country's first drive-through bank.

Geography
Cornelscourt has an area of 44.95 hectares. It stretches west to Kerrymount Avenue, south to the Old Bray Road, and east across the N11 to include all of Monaloe (directly behind Clonkeen College). Cornelscourt is in the civil parish of Kill, within the barony of Rathdown.  It is also in the electoral division of Stillorgan.

Cornelscourt consists of houses and shops on either side of a section of the bypassed Old Bray Road, between the junction with the N11 to the east. Along this strip are a petrol station and a pub called "The Magic Carpet" which contained one of Ireland's first non-smoking lounges in a pub - the "Samuel Beckett" lounge, named after a former customer - and which has an exhibition space, the "Gallery Intermarium"; a 60-seat theatre named the "Dolmen Theatre" opened above the pub in 2015 and closed in 2020. There are also several food outlets, a drama school, a convenience store, a pharmacy and the Dunnes Stores supermarket. The surrounding suburban housing is laid out in housing estates.

Ireland's first experimental drive-through bank opened in Cornelscourt in 1990 and closed 12 years later.

A bronze sculpture Eoinín na nÉan (Eoineen of the Birds) by Colm J. Brennan was erected in 2008.

Local Area Plan
The area has been designated a 'District Centre' by Dún Laoghaire County Council. A local area plan for the area is being implemented with the aim of making aesthetic and functional improvements through redesign of road layout, street furniture etc.

See also
List of towns and villages in Ireland

References

Places in Dún Laoghaire–Rathdown